Sonamukhi College (সোনামুখী মহাবিদ্যালয়) established in 1966, is the general degree college in Sonamukhi, Bankura district. It offers undergraduate courses in arts, commerce and sciences. It is affiliated to  Bankura University.

Departments

Science
Computer Science
Physics
Mathematics
Botany
Zoology
Chemistry

Arts and Commerce
Bengali
English
Sanskrit
History
Geography
Political Science
Philosophy
Physical Education
Education
Economics
Commerce

Accreditation
The college is recognized by the University Grants Commission (UGC).

See also

References

External links
Sonamukhi College

Colleges affiliated to Bankura University
Educational institutions established in 1966
Universities and colleges in Bankura district
1966 establishments in West Bengal